Louis Beaulieu (8 October 1840, Langon – decapitated 8 March 1866 at age 25) in Korea, was one of the priests of the Paris Foreign Missions Society who was among the 103 Korean Martyrs.

Beaulieu was ordinated on the 21 of May 1864, and left for Korea on 15 July. His mission proved very difficult, as the district he was assigned to prohibited the presence of foreigners, especially preachers. Beaulieu hid in the mountains for some time, but was ultimately arrested, judged, and decapitated on 8 March 1866.

He was beatified October 6, 1968 by Paul VI and canonized May 6, 1984 by John Paul II.

See also 
Catholic Church in Korea

References

External links 
 Saint-Louis Beaulieu on Nominis

French Roman Catholic missionaries
People from Langon, Gironde
1840 births
1866 deaths
19th-century Roman Catholic martyrs
19th-century executions by Korea
Canonizations by Pope John Paul II
Deaths by decapitation
Roman Catholic missionaries in Korea
French expatriates in Korea
Paris Foreign Missions Society missionaries